Hello I Feel the Same is the tenth studio album by American alternative band The Innocence Mission. It was released on October 16, 2015, via Korda Records, a cooperative record label founded by The Ocean Blue, a band with whom the Innocence Mission formed a "long and deep friendship that goes back to some of each band's first shows in Pennsylvania and their major label debut records on Sire and A&M". An edition on translucent green vinyl was released from early January 2016. It is their first studio album since 2010's My Room in the Trees, making five years the longest gap between studio albums in their career.

Release and promotion
To promote the album, The Innocence Mission embarked on their first live shows since 2004, performing as the opening act on select dates of a tour by The Ocean Blue. The band also performed a live session for WXPN's Key Studios. In February 2016, they performed a 40-minute set at the Roots & Blues music festival held at The Chameleon Club in Lancaster, Pennsylvania. An outtake from the My Room in the Trees sessions, "Trip", was released as a non-album single in July 2016, and features the band's original drummer, Steve Brown.

Track listing
All songs written by Karen Peris except "Barcelona", written by Don and Karen Peris

Personnel
The Innocence Mission
 Karen Peris – vocals, guitars, piano, field organ, bass harmonica, tambourine, bass (1, 11), artwork, design
 Don Peris – guitars, drums, bass (3, 10), backing vocals
 Mike Bitts – upright bass (2, 4, 6, 9), electric bass (7)
Additional musicians
 Anna Peris – viola on "The Color Green"
 Drew Peris – violin on "The Color Green"
Technical
 Carl Saff – mastering

Release history

References

2015 albums
The Innocence Mission albums